The Royal Yachting Association (RYA) is a United Kingdom national governing body for sailing, dinghy sailing, yacht and motor cruising, sail racing, RIBs and sportsboats, windsurfing and personal watercraft and a leading representative for inland waterways cruising.

History
The Yacht Racing Association was founded in November 1875. Its initial purpose was to standardize the rules of measurement to different racing yachts so that boats of different classes could compete fairly against each other.  Membership at the time cost two guineas and was available to "former and present owners of racing yachts of and above 10 tons Thames measurement and such other gentlemen as the committee may elect".

In 1921 the YRA incorporated the independent Sailing Boat Association and the Boat Racing Association into its body.  In 1952 the YRA became the Royal Yachting Association (RYA).

The RYA remains constituted as a membership association, with a Council of elected volunteers as its supreme policy-making body.  It publishes over 110 maritime titles that are regarded internationally and is translated into more than 20 foreign languages. RYA Magazine is the organisation's membership magazine.

Committees
While the RYA Council is the RYA's senior policy-making body in boating matters, responsibility for the Association's different activities and areas of interest is delegated to a number of policy committees.

The main function of the policy committees and sub-committees is to agree and oversee the implementation of RYA policy in their respective areas. Responsibility for day-to-day management of each area rests with the RYA's professional staff, with the relevant departmental manager acting as secretary to his or her committee.

Powerboat Racing 

The RYA announced in August 2018 that they would no longer act as the national authority for powerboat racing in the United Kingdom.

‘Financial, safety, and reputational challenge’s were the reasons given for the decision alongside the fact that the Powerboat Racing office had only issued 92 adult and 18 junior licences in 2018.

See also 

 Watersports
 Yachting
 Yacht club
 Association
 British Isles
 Sport in the United Kingdom
 International Council of Yacht Clubs
 British Marine Federation

References 

Great Britain
Sports governing bodies in the United Kingdom
1875 establishments in the United Kingdom
Yachting associations
Organisations based in the United Kingdom with royal patronage
Sailing associations
Sports organizations established in 1875